KCEU (89.7 FM) is a radio station in Price, Utah. It currently forms part of the Utah Public Radio network of Utah State University. The station had previously operated as the campus station at the College of Eastern Utah, which became Utah State University Eastern.

History

KCEU went on the air in 2010 as The Edge, "Eastern Utah's Only Alternative". The station ran an alternative format, prominently featuring the "Alternative Weekly Top 40". KCEU was a curriculum based station within the Department of Journalism and Communication at USU Eastern; staff were broadcast communication students from within the department.
In late 2014, the station became a repeater for Utah Public Radio, based at the USU campus in Logan.

References

External links

CEU
CEU
2010 establishments in Utah